We Are Klang is a British comedy sketch show, starring Greg Davies, Steve Hall and Marek Larwood, and produced for BBC Three. The programme was short-lived, only running for six episodes in 2009, between 30 July to 10 September, and focused on the antics of the three as town council members for the fictional town of Klangbury, often having to deal with a serious problem that would result in them being fired if not resolved. The show frequently involved adult comedy with an anarchic style in presentation, which had won the group – operating as a three-piece comedy sketch group of the same name – notable acclaim for their stage performances.

In 2010, the group attempted to launch a new variety show called "The Klang Show", following the conclusion of We Are Klang, but only a pilot was ever created which aired on 16 August 2010 on BBC Three.

Premise
We Are Klang focuses on the lives of Greg Davies, Steve Hall and Marek Larwood as town council members of Klangbury – a fictional town, whose locations were filmed within Stalybridge, eight miles east of Manchester – each of whom had different roles. While Davies was the Deputy Mayor, Steve was in charge of Health and Safety and frequently caused more problems, and Marek was a dim-witted assistant who frequently is tormented for making up stupid ideas. All three face a problem in each episode that they had to solve for the town's mayor, or risk being fired for failing. Solving such problems often involved methods that would not always work well or go wrong, but with the trio often eventually resolving the issue in time to the satisfaction of the mayor. Episodes often involved several characters that inhabited Klangbury, each played by one of the three, featured at least one song the group performed, and featured a sketch that would involve members of the programme's studio audience (referred to as the "Department of Audience") partaking in it.

Cast 
The show's regular cast consisted of:

 Greg Davies
 Marek Larwood
 Steve Hall
 Debbie Chazen as the Mayor of Klangbury
 David Ward as Leslie, the Mayor's assistant

The show also featured appearances by Lorna Watson and Sally Harrison, while Ainsley Harriott appeared as himself during one episode.

Episodes

References

External links

2009 British television series debuts
2009 British television series endings
2000s British comedy television series
BBC television sitcoms
Edinburgh Festival performers
English-language television shows
Metafictional television series